Æthelred I or Ethelred I may refer to:

 Æthelred I of Wessex, King of Wessex from 865 to 871
 Æthelred I of Northumbria, King of Northumbria from 774 to 779 and again from 788 or 789 until his murder in 796
 Æthelred I of East Anglia, King of East Anglia

See also 
 Æthelred (disambiguation)